The English Long-faced Tumbler is a breed of fancy pigeon developed over many years of selective breeding. English Long-faced Tumblers, along with other varieties of domesticated pigeons, are all descendants of the rock dove (Columba livia).

This breed is available in both clean legged and muffed (feathered legs) varieties. Due to its short beak it requires foster parents (homing pigeons, etc.) to raise its young. The breed is popular around the world and has continued development particularly in the United States.

See also 

List of pigeon breeds

References

Pigeon breeds
Pigeon breeds originating in England